Brent Darby (June 6, 1981 – December 6, 2011) was an American professional basketball player. He played at the point guard position.

College career
Darby played college basketball with the Ohio State Buckeyes, between 1999 and 2003, and was a part of two Big Ten champion teams. He averaged 9.6 points per game in his sophomore season, 12.8 points per game as a junior, and 18.3 points and 4.4 assists per game in his senior year, in 2002–03. At the end of his college career, he was ranked 25th on the school's career scoring list, with 1,368 points scored.

Professional career
After college, Darby played professional basketball internationally, from 2003 until 2009, in Israel, Poland, Spain, and France (Limoges CSP), and he also spent several years in Italy (Pepsi Juvecaserta Basket, Giorgio Tesi PT, Banco di Sardegna Sassari, S.S. Felice Scandone (Sidigas AV), Umana Reyer Venezia Mestre).

Personal life and death
Darby eventually had to stop playing basketball, as he battled a series of blood clot problems. Doctors implanted filters in Darby's body to break up clots before they reached his lungs, and he had a surgery to remove a large clot from his leg. He died in 2011.

References

1981 births
2011 deaths
American expatriate basketball people in France
American expatriate basketball people in Israel
American expatriate basketball people in Italy
American expatriate basketball people in Poland
American men's basketball players
AZS Koszalin players
Basketball players from Michigan
Deaths from thrombosis
Dinamo Sassari players
Juvecaserta Basket players
Limoges CSP players
Maccabi Rishon LeZion basketball players
Ohio State Buckeyes men's basketball players
Pallacanestro Trapani players
People from River Rouge, Michigan
Pistoia Basket 2000 players
Point guards
Reyer Venezia players
S.S. Felice Scandone players
Spójnia Stargard players